Vladimir Mandić (born 5 July 1987]) is a Slovenian of Serbian descent, a footballer who plays as a midfielder for Cement Beočin. He had previously played in Slovenia, Austria, Bosnia and Herzegovina, and Montenegro.

References

External links

Living people
1987 births
FK Banat Zrenjanin players
FK Cement Beočin players
Slovenian footballers
Slovenian people of Serbian descent
Association football midfielders
People from Ptuj